Mário Antônio da Silva (born 17 October 1966) is a Brazilian prelate of the Catholic Church who has been the Bishop of Roraima since June 2016. He was previously auxiliary bishop of Manaus for six years.

Mário Antônio da Silva was born in Itararé, State of São Paulo, on 17 October 1966. He studied philosophy and theology at the Divine Mestre Diocesan Seminary in Jacarezinho from 1985 to 1991. He then earned a licenciate in moral theology at the Alphonsian Academy in Rome (1996-1998).

On 21 December 1991 he was ordained a priest of the Diocese of Jacarezinho, where he worked as Spiritual Director (1992-1993) and then Rector of the Minor Seminary Nossa Senhora da Assunção (1994-1996); Coordinator of Vocation Ministry (1993-1996); Professor of Moral Theology and Spiritual Director of the Divine Major Seminary Mestre; Parochial Vicar; Pastor and Chancellor.

On 9 June 2010, Pope Benedict XVI named him auxiliary bishop of Manaus.  He received his episcopal consecration on 20 August from Mauro Aparecido dos Santos, Archbishop of Cascavel. On 22 June 2016, Pope Francis named him Bishop of Roraima.

He is vice president of the Episcopal Conference of Brazil.

He was a participant in the Synod of Bishops for the Pan-Amazon region in 2019. He was one of four Synod prelates elected on 7 October to the thirteen-person committee to prepare the Synod's concluding document.

Notes

References

External links

Living people
1966 births
21st-century Roman Catholic bishops in Brazil
People from São Paulo (state)
Alphonsian Academy alumni
Roman Catholic bishops of Manaus
Roman Catholic bishops of Roraima